Gadwin Springer (born 4 April 1993) is a French professional rugby league footballer who last played as a  for Featherstone Rovers in the Betfred Championship and France at international level. 

He previously played for the Catalans Dragons and the Castleford Tigers (Heritage № 960) in the Super League. Springer spent time on loan from Castleford at Halifax and Toronto Wolfpack (Heritage № 50) in the Championship. He played for Featherstone Rovers in 2021 and signed for Toulouse in November 2021. He was the first South American to ever appear in Super League.

Background
Springer was born in French Guiana and did not discover rugby league until he moved from South America to the south-west of France in 2005. Springer originally moved to Villeneuve but developed his rugby in the Toulouse Olympique academy before being signed for Catalans Dragons.

Club career

Catalans Dragons
Springer was signed by Catalans Dragons from the Toulouse Olympique academy and made his Super League début on 14 March 2014 as a substitute against St. Helens.

Castleford Tigers
On 12 June 2015 Springer joined Castleford Tigers on a -year contract.

He was a member of Castleford's squad which won the League Leaders Shield in 2017, making 21 appearances during the season, and was named as 18th man for the 2017 Super League Grand Final.

Halifax
On 6 November 2020 it was announced that Springer would join Halifax Panthers for the 2021 season

Featherstone Rovers
On 26 July 2021, it was reported that he had signed for Featherstone Rovers in the RFL Championship

Toulouse Olympique
In September 2021 it was reported that Springer would join Villeneuve Leopards in the French Elite One Championship at the end of his contract with Featherstone. Subsequently Toulouse Olympique won promotion to Super League and on 3 November it was announced that Springer had signed for Toulouse for their 2022 Super League season.

International career
Gadwin was selected for France for their 2015 European Cup campaign. He made his international début against Ireland in Albi. He also played for France in their mid-tournament test match against England. He was a part of what was considered a 'weakened' French side due to injury and it showed with an appalling showing against their opponents. Springer played in France's lone international fixture of 2016, an end of year test match against England in Avignon.

References

External links
Toronto Wolfpack profile
Castleford Tigers profile
Catalans Dragons profile
SL profile
France profile

1993 births
Living people
Castleford Tigers players
Catalans Dragons players
Featherstone Rovers players
French Guianan rugby league players
Halifax R.L.F.C. players
Rugby league second-rows
Toronto Wolfpack players
Toulouse Olympique players
Villeneuve Leopards players
France national rugby league team players